Major Sherman Cottle is a fictional character in the reimagined Battlestar Galactica series. The battlestar Galactica's Chief Medical Officer, Cottle is played by Donnelly Rhodes.

Character biography

Cottle is gruff, sarcastic, and portrayed as a heavy smoker. He isn't impressed or easily swayed by those in authority: He makes less-than-deferential remarks to both Cdr. William Adama and Col. Saul Tigh, and even President Laura Roslin. He holds the rank of Major in the Colonial Fleet, but is not a line officer: he does not form a part of Galactica's chain of command.  He is invariably addressed by his medical title, and unlike Gaius Baltar, Cottle does not object to the abbreviation "Doc".

Cottle appears to have a strict sense of medical ethics (possibly having sworn the Colonial equivalent of Earth's Hippocratic oath), and does not discriminate between human and Cylon patients. He describes the sexual assault of Sharon "Athena" Agathon as "unforgivable," and after the Cylon occupation of New Caprica, provides medical care to critically injured Cylons, telling Number Three that all patients are the same to him.

President Roslin is a long term patient: she informs him of her breast cancer diagnosis two weeks after the destruction of the Twelve Colonies, and continues to see him at various points until her near death and successful treatment by Doctor Baltar. Cottle opposes but does not obstruct Baltar's treatment method, which uses the blood of Sharon Agathon's unborn child, calling it "unnatural".

Cottle appears to be among those who muster out of the Colonial Fleet after the establishment of the settlement on planet New Caprica. He continues to provide medical services as a civilian doctor, frustrated by the lack of antibiotics and other medical supplies. Following the Cylon invasion, Cottle acts as a neutral party, providing medical care to all those in need.

Following the rescue of the New Caprica colonists, Cottle resumes his duties as Galactica's chief medical officer. He volunteers for the apparent suicide mission in the series finale, Daybreak", but is reminded by William Adama that the fleet can not afford to lose a doctor. The civilian fleet reunites with Galactica after the battle, at the new habitable planet Starbuck jumped it to. Cottle then settles down on the new planet, named "Earth" after the original one, with the rest of the surviving crew.

References

External links
 Sherman Cottle at Battlestar Wiki

Battlestar Galactica (2004 TV series) characters
Fictional physicians
Fictional majors
Fictional surgeons
Fictional medical personnel
Television characters introduced in 2005